Acontia albida is a moth of the family Noctuidae. It is found in South America, including Brazil.

Adults are on wing in November and December.

External links
Noctuídeos (Lepidoptera, Noctuidae) Do Museu Entomológico Ceslau Biezanko, Departamento De Fitossanidade, Faculdade De Agronomia “Eliseu Maciel”, Universidade Federal De Pelotas, Rs

albida
Moths described in 1910
Moths of South America